The 2003 Men's World Team Squash Championships is the men's edition of the 2003 World Team Squash Championships organized by the World Squash Federation,  which serves as the world team championship for squash players. The event were held in Vienna, Austria and took place from October 19-25, 2003.

Participating teams
A total of 30 teams competed from all the five confederations: Africa, America, Asia, Europe and Oceania. For Bermuda, Czech Republic, Hungary, Russia, Slovenia and South Korea it was their first participation at a world team championship.

Group stage results

Pool A

Pool B

Pool C

Pool D

Pool E

Pool F

Pool G 

|}

Pool H

Finals

Draw

Third Place play off

Final

See also 
World Team Squash Championships
World Squash Federation
World Open (squash)

References 

World Squash Championships
Squash tournaments in Austria
International sports competitions hosted by Austria
Squash
Men